This is a list of live action prime time network television shows that were turned into animated series.

Spinoffs
A